Einstein Healthcare Network is a private non-profit healthcare organization based in the Philadelphia, Pennsylvania region of the United States. The healthcare network serves Greater Philadelphia and its flagship hospital is the Einstein Medical Center Philadelphia, a safety net hospital, located in Philadelphia. The healthcare network offers residency and fellowship training programs in many specialized areas, including pharmacy practice. The healthcare network has a combine total of 1,044 beds and has over 8,500 employees.

Locations

Albert Einstein Healthcare Network operates the following hospitals:

Einstein Medical Center Philadelphia in Philadelphia (Logan neighborhood in North Philadelphia)
Einstein Medical Center Elkins Park in Elkins Park
Einstein Medical Center Montgomery in East Norriton Township
MossRehab in Elkins Park

Einstein Healthcare Network also operates outpatient centers in the Philadelphia neighborhoods of Bustleton, Germantown, Holmesburg, and Logan along with the suburban Philadelphia communities of Blue Bell, Collegeville, East Norriton Township, King of Prussia, Lansdale, Norristown, and Plymouth Meeting.

History
The Einstein Medical Center was built in 1864 as Jewish Hospital for the Aged, Infirmed and Destitute also known as the Jewish Hospital. The hospital had a goal to provide medical care to "the sick and wounded without regard to creed, color or nationality". Einstein Medical Center officially opened in 1866 with 22 beds at 56th and Haverford Road in West Philadelphia. The hospital expanded, moving to Old York Road in 1873, and opening various homes and clinics. By the 20th century, Jewish-sponsored hospitals such as the Jewish Hospital became havens for Jewish doctors who could not admit their patients to other hospitals because of anti-Semitism.

In 1951, volunteer president of Mount Sinai wrote a letter asking physicist Albert Einstein for permission to use his name as a part of the hospital. Einstein gave them permission in a letter dated June 28, 1951. In 1952, the Jewish hospital merged with Northern Liberties Hospital and Mount Sinai Hospital to form a single medical center.

During the 1990s, Einstein Medical Network combined with MossRehab. In 2018, Einstein Healthcare reach a conclusive agreement to merge with Jefferson Health. The merger would create an 18-hospital system and garner $5.9 billion in revenue including over "50 outpatient and urgent-care centers, leading rehabilitation and post-acute facilities" and maintain almost 39,000 employees. The hospital systems would retain their original names and donations to Einstein would remain at Einstein. In 2018, Jefferson Health was ranked second in number of beds with 2,885. The healthcare system will regain top place after the merger which is undergoing regulatory review process as of November 2019.

See also
 List of hospitals in Philadelphia

References

External links
 

Healthcare in Pennsylvania
Hospital networks in the United States
Medical and health organizations based in Pennsylvania